Hirini Whaanga Christy (16 August 1883 – 1 July 1955) was a New Zealand Mormon leader, farmer, interpreter, community leader. Of Māori descent, he identified with the Ngati Kahungunu and Ngati Rakaipaaka iwi. He was born in Nūhaka, New Zealand, on 16 August 1883. He was a great grandson of Ihaka Whaanga.

Christy emigrated to Utah Territory in 1894 with his extended family. Christy attended high school in Salt Lake City and later graduated from Latter-day Saints' University, where he was a star athlete. Christy was a member of the Mormon Tabernacle Choir and married Kathleen Welsh in 1907.

In 1918, Christy and his family returned to New Zealand and settled in Nūhaka. While there, he became the first Māori to become a seventy in the Church of Jesus Christ of Latter-day Saints.

References

1883 births
1955 deaths
New Zealand emigrants to the United States
New Zealand farmers
Interpreters
Ngāti Kahungunu people
Ngati Rakaipaaka people
New Zealand leaders of the Church of Jesus Christ of Latter-day Saints
People from Nūhaka
Tabernacle Choir members
Seventies (LDS Church)
New Zealand Māori religious leaders
Ensign College alumni